Three minutes may refer to:

Three-minute warning
3 Minutes 2010 action film
Three Minutes episode of Lost

3 minutes is forever

See also
Three minutes to midnight
Three Minutes to Earth song by Georgian jazz band The Shin and Georgian singer Mariko Ebralidze
The First Three Minutes 1977 book by American physicist Steven Weinberg